Alberto Josué Machado Becerril (born September 9, 1990) is a Puerto Rican professional boxer who held the WBA (Regular) super featherweight title from 2017 to 2019. Machado is ranked as the world's third best active super featherweight by The Ring magazine, the Transnational Boxing Rankings Board, and Boxrec.

Amateur career 
Machado started boxing at 10, in Monte Hatillo, San Juan. Despite being right-handed, he's boxed as a southpaw ever since. Machado won several national competitions.  Machado represented Puerto Rico at the 2008 AIBA Youth World Boxing Championships. He won two bouts before losing in the quarterfinals to Timacoy Williams. Machado took part in the 2012 American Boxing Olympic Qualification Tournament but failed to qualify for the 2012 Summer Olympics as he lost to Alberto Melián in the second round. He had about 168 fights as an amateur before turning pro at 22.

Professional career 
Machado won his first 8 fights before competing for the USNBC super featherweight title against fellow Puerto Rican prospect Alvin Torres. Machado would prove to be too much for Torres, winning by technical knockout in the second round. Between 2015 and 2016, Machado scored five consecutive first-round knockouts. Machado's second title would be the NABO super featherweight, for which he defeated Juan José Martínez by TKO in just one round. Machado unified North American titles against NABA super featherweight titlist, Carlos Morales. Morales was knocked down on the second round before losing a wide unanimous decision (99-90, 99-90, 98-91).

Machado challenged WBA (super) champion Jezreel Corrales on 21 October 2017. The fight headlined an HBO Boxing After Dark show. Corrales lost his title on the scales, coming in at 134 lb, 4 above the division's weight limit. Corrales started the fight dominating Machado with sharper boxing and better footwork. Machado was rocked by several punches early in the fight and he was dropped in round 5. However, Machado came out strong in round 6 and had Corrales badly hurt. Corrales resorted to holding and tackled Machado, with both fighters hit the canvas. From that point, the defending champion was unable to use his better technique to his advantage. One of his gloves touched the canvas during round 7 but the referee failed to score it a knockdown. In round 8, Machado landed a hard left hook that dropped Corrales. Corrales was unable to recover before he was counted out, giving Machado the win and the title. Machado dedicated the victory to the victims of Hurricane Maria in Puerto Rico. As Machado was interviewed by Max Kellerman, Corrales tried to interrupt and demand a rematch but he was brushed off.

Professional boxing record

See also 

List of Puerto Rican boxing world champions
List of super featherweight boxing champions

References

External links

1990 births
Living people
People from Río Piedras, Puerto Rico
Puerto Rican male boxers
Southpaw boxers
Super-featherweight boxers
World super-featherweight boxing champions
World Boxing Association champions